Family Force 5 EP was the first recording released by Family Force 5 under their new name. This EP is exactly the same as The Phamily EP, except for the name of the band and the addition of the song "Cadillac Phunque".

Track listing

Credits
 Solomon "Soul Glow Activatur" Olds – Vocals, guitar, programming, synthesizers
 Jacob "Crouton" Olds – Drums, vocals
 Joshua "Phatty" Olds – Bass, vocals
 Nathan "Nadaddy" Currin – DJ
 Brad "20 Cent" Allen – Guitars

References

Family Force 5 albums
2005 EPs
Maverick Records EPs